The 1974 Swedish speedway season was the 1974 season of motorcycle speedway in Sweden.

Individual

Individual Championship
The 1974 Swedish Individual Speedway Championship final was held on 20 September in Eskilstuna. Tommy Jansson won the Swedish Championship.

Junior Championship
 
Winner - Jan Andersson

Team

Team Championship
Getingarna won division 1 and were declared the winners of the Swedish Speedway Team Championship for the eighth time. The team included Anders Michanek and Leif Enecrona.

Lejonen and Masarna won the second division A & B respectively, while Jämtarna won the third division.

See also 
 Speedway in Sweden

References

Speedway leagues
Professional sports leagues in Sweden
Swedish
Seasons in Swedish speedway